Pacifantistea is a monotypic genus of Asian dwarf sheet spiders containing the single species, Pacifantistea ovtchinnikovi. It was first described by Yuri M. Marusik in 2011, and has only been found in Russia and in Japan.

References

Hahniidae
Monotypic Araneomorphae genera
Spiders of Asia
Spiders of Russia